The Aurcana Corporation is a Canadian mining company active in the United States and formerly active in Mexico. It is headquartered in Vancouver, British Columbia, Canada. It is listed on the TSX Venture Exchange.

Assets

Through its American subsidiary, Silver Assets Inc., it operates a silver mine in Shafter, Presidio County, Texas, USA.

Through its American subsidiary, Ouray Silver Mines, Inc., it operates the Revenue‐Virginius mine in Ouray, Colorado.

References

Companies based in Vancouver
Mining companies of Canada
Mining in Mexico
Mining in Texas
Querétaro
Presidio County, Texas
Companies listed on the TSX Venture Exchange